Intel Extreme Masters Season XII – Oakland (IEM Oakland 2017 for short) was an esports event in Oakland, United States in November 2017. It was hosted by ESL as a part of Intel Extreme Masters Season 12. The event consist of two First-person shooter tournaments, Counter-Strike: Global Offensive and PlayerUnknown's Battlegrounds, and involved many invited and qualified teams from different regions of the world.

Venue
The main event of the tournament took take place at the Oracle Arena in Oakland, California, United States. It is a multipurpose arena known as the home tenant of NBA team Golden State Warriors, with total capacity around 20,000. It is the second time for Oracle Arena to host the event, after it previously hosted the IEM Oakland 2016.

Counter-Strike: Global Offensive

Participating Teams

Direct invitees 

  Astralis
  Cloud9
  FaZe Clan
  G2 Esports
  Gambit Esports
  Ninjas in Pyjamas
  Renegades
  SK Gaming
  Team Liquid

Regional qualifier winners 

  OpTic Gaming (North America)
  Team EnVyUs (Europe)
  The MongolZ (East and Southeast Asia)

Format 
The group matches were held in Intel Esports Arena in Burbank, California between November 15–16, 2017 and used round robin format, while the playoffs in Oakland used single elimination format with 2 allocated byes for each group winners in the quarterfinals. 12 participating teams were divided between 2 groups of six. All group matches are played with best-of-one format, while playoffs and grand finals are best-of-three and best-of-five respectively. Group standings are determined by points and rounds won-lost difference. A win in normal time resulted 3 points, while a win in overtime resulted in 2 points, also a loss in overtime resulted in 1 point. Each group winners went straight to semifinals, while first and second group runners-up faced each other in quarterfinals.

Results

Group stage

Group A

Group B

Playoffs

Grand finals

Winnings
The total prize money for the tournament was confirmed by ESL as US$300,000. The champions and runners-up were rewarded US$125,000 and US$50,000, respectively. In addition to the base prize pool, teams were awarded US$1,000 per group stage victory.

PlayerUnknown's Battlegrounds

Participating Teams

Direct invitees 

  Alliance
  Cloud9
  Evil Geniuses
  FaZe Clan
  Luminosity Gaming
  Method
  Ninjas in Pyjamas
  Noble
  Penta Sports
  Team SoloMid
  Team Liquid
  Tempo Storm

Regional qualifier winners 

  *aAa* Gaming (Europe)
  Corn Shuckers (North America)
  Crimson Esports (Europe)
  Digital Chaos (Europe)
  Ghost Gaming (North America)
  Miami Flamingos (North America)
  Ronin Esports (North America)
  Wind and Rain (Europe)

Format 
The tournament used the battle royal format where all 20 teams, each consist of 4 players, were simultaneously battling and eliminating each other in 8 matches across both days of the event. Teams were awarded points based on both finishing points and accrued kills within each match. The winning team were decided by cumulative points received after all matches had been played.

Results 
French team *aAa* Gaming won the tournament with the highest cumulative points at the end of the 8th match. Second and third place went to two American teams Tempo Storm and Ghost Gaming, respectively.

Final standings

References

External links
Official site

2017 first-person shooter tournaments
2017 in sports in California
Counter-Strike competitions
Intel Extreme Masters
International esports competitions hosted by the United States
November 2017 sports events in the United States
PlayerUnknown's Battlegrounds competitions
Sports competitions in Oakland, California